Zdenekia is a genus of prehistoric winged insect. It contains the species Z. grandis from the Czech Republic, Z. occidentalis from Belgium, and Z. silesiensis from Poland.

References

Carboniferous insects
Fossils of the Czech Republic
Fossils of Poland
Prehistoric insect genera